Vasanthakala is a 2008 Indian Kannada-language romantic action film written and directed by Vaddanahalli Srinivas  making his debut. The film is produced by M Krishna under the banner Parvathi Parameshwara Combines. It features Naga Kiran and Hariprriya  in the lead roles. The supporting cast includes Sudhakar, Rangayana Raghu, Sharan and Umashree. The score and soundtrack for the film is by V. Manohar and the cinematography is by Venus Murthy.

Cast 

 Naga Kiran
 Hariprriya
 Sudhakar
 Rangayana Raghu
 Sharan
 Umashree
 Padmavasanthi
 Latha

Soundtrack 

The film's background score and the soundtracks are composed by V. Manohar. The music rights were acquired by  Annapurneshwari Audio.

Reception

Critical response 

A critic from Sify.com wrote  "Rangayana Raghu is a pain. The screaming is a torture to the brain nerves. Manohar has done good work in the music by offering two good tunes. Cinematography is good at places".

References 

2010s Kannada-language films
Films shot in Mysore
Films shot in Bangalore